L'Intransigeant was a French newspaper founded in July 1880 by Henri Rochefort. Initially representing the left-wing opposition, it moved towards the right during the Boulanger affair (Rochefort supported Boulanger) and became a major right-wing newspaper by the 1920s. The newspaper was vehemently anti-Dreyfusard, reflecting Rochefort's positions. In 1906 under the direction of Léon Bailby it reaches a circulation of 400,000 copies. It ceased publication after the French surrender in 1940. After the war it was briefly republished in 1947 under the name L'Intransigeant-Journal de Paris, before merging with Paris-Presse.

References

External links
 Issues of L'intransigeant from 1880 to 1940 viewable on line in Gallica, the digital library of the BnF

1880 establishments in France
1940 disestablishments in France
Newspapers established in 1880
Publications disestablished in 1940
Defunct newspapers published in France